Blepharomastix coatepecensis is a moth in the family Crambidae. It was described by Herbert Druce in 1895. It is found in Mexico.

The forewings and hindwings are pale brownish white. The former crossed by three waved brown lines from the costal to the inner margin. The hindwings are crossed by two waved brown lines. The marginal line is dark brown.

References

Moths described in 1895
Blepharomastix